Baltyboys House, also known as Boystown House, is an 18th-century Georgian country house in Blessington, County Wicklow, Ireland.

Baltyboys House is a mansion built in the Georgian style. The estate sits on one hundred acres in Blessington, County Wicklow. It is located a mile from Russborough House, near Poulaphouca Reservoir.

The estate was previously owned by the Smiths, a gentry family. Elizabeth Grant Smith, the wife of Colonel Henry Smith, wrote extensively about managing the estate, particularly during the Great Famine. Dame Ninette de Valois, the great-granddaughter of Elizabeth Grant Smith, was born at Baltyboys.

In January 2014 the estate sold for €4.925 million by the owner, Elizabeth McClory, daughter of Vincent O'Brien and second wife of Kevin McClory. Baltyboys was not listed on the market, instead being sold through a private auction at Christie's.

References 

Buildings and structures completed in the 18th century
Buildings and structures in County Wicklow
Country houses in Ireland
Georgian architecture in Ireland
Houses in the Republic of Ireland